The Maoist insurgency in Turkey, also known as the People's War in Turkey (Turkish: Halk savaşı), is an ongoing low-level insurgency in eastern Turkey between the Turkish government and Maoist rebels that began in the early 1970s. The insurgency declined in the late 1980s and 1990s and has been sidelined by the larger Kurdish–Turkish conflict (1978–present). Low-level armed attacks continue to be carried out by Maoist insurgent groups, the most significant of which are the Liberation Army of the Workers and Peasants of Turkey (TİKKO) (the armed wing of the Communist Party of Turkey/Marxist–Leninist) and the People's Liberation Army (HKO) and People's Partisan Forces (PHG), both armed wings of the Maoist Communist Party.

History

On 24 April 1972, the Communist Party of Turkey/Marxist–Leninist (TKP/ML, sometimes incorrectly referred to as Partizan after the name of one of its publications) was formed by a radical group led by İbrahim Kaypakkaya, and intended to wage a people's war. However, a year later Kaypakkaya was captured, tortured and killed. In 1978, it had its first conference, affirming its plan for guerrilla warfare, although little progress was made in this direction. The TKP/ML was involved in political violence between left and right wing groups in the 1970s.

TKP/ML's military wing, the Liberation Army of the Workers and Peasants of Turkey (TİKKO), carried out militant and guerrilla actions in the late 1970s and throughout the 1980s, mainly in the Tunceli Province, whose inhabitants saw the Maoist guerrilla war as revenge for the repression of the Dersim rebellion in 1938. TİKKO reached its height during this period, carrying out guerrilla warfare in the mountainous areas of the Dersim and Black Sea regions.

In the late 1980s, the TKP/ML suffered from a series of splits following the party's second congress. In 1993, the TKP/ML attempted unsuccessfully to reunify with the Maoist Communist Party (Turkey)

On 17 May 1985, the TKP/ML broadcast a propaganda message to millions of television viewers in Istanbul, replacing the soundtrack for the evening news.

2000s
In 2000, Turkish security forces launched operations against TİKKO insurgents in the provinces of Tokat and Sivas. Discovering 12 hideouts, they recovered nine machine guns, four rocket launchers, grenades, and explosives, as well as 10 tonnes of food and medicine.

On 11 December 2000, TİKKO insurgents open fire on a police special task force, killing two and wounding 12.

In 2001, police captured five insurgents and weapons including two 9K111 Fagot anti-tank missiles.

In March 2009, Tamer Bilici, a doctor in service during a 2000 hunger strike in Kandıra F-type prison, was "in front of his house punished with death" by MKP-HKO for being a public enemy because he was blamed for the deaths and permanent disabilities of inmates. In September 2009 MKP-HKO claimed responsibility for the death of a retired colonel, Aytekin İçmez.

2010s

2010–2014
On 29 June 2010, two guerrillas of the TİKKO were killed in the mountains of Tunceli by the Turkish state forces.

On 2 February 2011, five guerrillas of TİKKO in Tunceli died as a result of an avalanche.

On 15 November 2012, 24 guerrillas of HKO were surrounded and captured in Tunceli

On 26 July 2013, the control building of a hydroelectric power plant regulator was bombed in the countryside of Tunceli Province by TİKKO militants.

On 14 March 2014, TİKKO guerrillas attacked a police station in Tunceli. TKP/ML declared that the attack was revenge for the death of Berkin Elvan.

On 8 July 2014, TİKKO guerrillas stopped a truck carrying five workers to a base station at Altınyüzük and set the vehicle on fire.

On 15 August 2014, TiKKO guerrillas attacked a Gendarmerie Station in Ovacik, no Deaths were reported.

2015–2018
In June 2015, MKP-PHG killed former colonel Fehmi Altinbilek.

On 22 July, TİKKO guerrillas attacked a Gendarmerie Station in Hozat. No casualties were reported.

On 10 October, guerrillas of the PKK and the TKP / ML-TİKKO attacked the military base of Geyiksuyu in the province of Tunceli.

On 15 October, TİKKO guerrillas attacked the military base of Amukta, in Hozat county.

On 21 October, three TİKKO guerrillas died in a clash with TSK in Ovacık.

The funeral of guerrillas was attended by hundreds of people, who sang songs and shouted revolutionary slogans.

On 9 May 2016, two TİKKO guerrillas were killed in Geyiksuyu during a clash with TSK Soldiers.

During 24–28 November, twelve guerrillas of TKP/ML TİKKO died during an army operation at Aliboğazı region of the Dersim province.

On 10 February 2017, TİKKO fighters set fire to the AKP headquarter in Pendik district, Istanbul.

On 18 June, MKP-HKO guerrillas attacked the military base of Kuşluca in Tunceli, Halkin Günlüğü claimed the attack killed two soldiers and wounded one.

On 1 August, three MKP-HKO guerrillas were killed in a clash with TSK in Ovacık.

On 18 August, two MKP-HKO guerrillas died when they were surrounded in Hozat by the armed forces.

On 26 September, two MKP-HKO guerrillas were killed by TSK soldiers in Ovacık.

On 16 November, four MKP-HKO guerrillas were killed in clashes with TSK.

On 24 April 2018, two female TİKKO guerrillas were killed and another was captured by TSK Soldiers in Tunceli.

On 5/6 August, six TİKKO guerrillas were killed by the Turkish Army in Tunceli.

In culture
 Some songs of music bands such as Grup Munzur and Grup Yorum refer to insurgency in Dersim.
 Dersim'de Doğan Güneş

See also
Kurdish–Turkish conflict (1978–present)
Political violence in Turkey (1976–80)
DHKP/C insurgency in Turkey
Gezi Park protests
Armed resistance in Chile (1973–90)
Communist rebellion in the Philippines
Colombian conflict (1964–present)
Internal conflict in Peru
Naxalite–Maoist insurgency

References

External links
New Turkey - revolutionary news portal
Banned Thought - Turkey
Özgür Gelecek - news portal related to TKP/ML
Kaypakkaya partizan
Halkin Gunlugu - news portal related to MKP
List of maoist guerillas killed in Turkey
Videos from the People's War in Turkey

Communist rebellions
Far-left politics in Turkey
Guerrilla wars
History of Tunceli Province
Insurgencies in Asia
Maoism in Turkey
Political history of Turkey
Rebellions in Turkey
Economic history of Turkey
Communism-based civil wars
Conflicts in Turkey